Bobby Wayne Mitchell (February 23, 1943 – March 20, 2018) was an American professional golfer who played on the PGA Tour and the Champions Tour.

Mitchell was born in Chatham, Virginia and was raised in nearby Danville, Virginia. He dropped out of high school and turned pro at 15. He won the  Virginia State Golf Association Open, the Virginia State PGA Open and the Carolinas PGA Championship before joining the PGA Tour.

Mitchell won two PGA Tour events during his career: the 1971 Cleveland Open and the 1972 Tournament of Champions. He had more than two dozen top-10 finishes in PGA Tour events including more than a half-dozen 2nd or 3rd-place finishes. His best finish in a major was T2 at the 1972 Masters Tournament.

Since 1991, Mitchell has traveled to Finland in the summer to teach golf to young people in association with Averett University. Mitchell joined the Champions Tour in 1995; his best finish in a Champions Tour event is a T-12 at The Transamerica in 1995.

Mitchell died on March 20, 2018 from a presumed heart attack at Lynchburg General Hospital.

Professional wins (4)

PGA Tour wins (2)

PGA Tour playoff record (1–0)

Other wins (2)
1965 Virginia Open, Virginia PGA Open
1967 Carolinas PGA Championship

Results in major championships

CUT = missed the half-way cut
"T" = tied

References

External links

American male golfers
PGA Tour golfers
PGA Tour Champions golfers
Golfers from Virginia
People from Chatham, Virginia
Sportspeople from Danville, Virginia
1943 births
2018 deaths